Parisienne is a perfume for women produced by French fashion house Yves Saint Laurent, released in 2009. Its brand ambassador is Kate Moss.

References

External links
 "Parisienne" at Basenotes.net

Products introduced in 2009